The women's 57 kg competition at the 2016 Summer Olympics was held on 18 August, at the Carioca Arena 3. The defending champion, Jade Jones, representing Great Britain, successfully defended her title, winning her second Olympics gold. Eva Calvo from Spain finished with a silver medal, beating second-time Olympian Hedaya Malak in the semifinal and Iran's Kimia Alizadeh in the quarterfinal, both of whom went on to win a bronze in the repechage.

Competition format
The main bracket consisted of a single elimination tournament, culminating in the gold medal match. The top eight athletes in each event were seeded so as not to face each other in the preliminary round. The remainder of the qualified athletes were drawn randomly on 15 August 2016. Two bronze medals were awarded at the Taekwondo competitions.  A repechage was used to determine the bronze medal winners. Every competitor who lost to one of the two finalists competed in the repechage, another single-elimination competition. Each semifinal loser faced the last remaining repechage competitor from the opposite half of the bracket in a bronze medal match.

Schedule 
All times are in local time (UTC-3).

Seeds
Every practitioner was seeded at the event. Practitioners representing the hosting nation were seeded as no. 4 regardless of their current world ranking.

Results

Legend
PTG – Won by points gap
SUD – Won by sudden death (golden point)

Main bracket

Repechage

References

External links
Results

Women's 57 kg
Women's events at the 2016 Summer Olympics
Olymp